The IFT Research & Development Award has been awarded since 1997. It has been awarded by the Institute of Food Technologists (IFT) to scientists who have made recent and significant research and development contributions to the understanding of food science, food technology, or nutrition.

Award winners receive a USD 3000 honorarium and a plaque from IFT.

Winners

References

List of past winners - Official site

Food technology awards
Awards established in 1997